Knute Johnsgaard (born 5 December 1992 in Whitehorse, Yukon) is a Canadian cross-country skier. He competed in the 2018 Winter Olympics.

Cross-country skiing results
All results are sourced from the International Ski Federation (FIS).

Olympic Games

World Championships

World Cup

Season standings

Team podiums
 1 podium – (1 )

References

External links
 
 

1992 births
Living people
Cross-country skiers at the 2018 Winter Olympics
Canadian male cross-country skiers
Olympic cross-country skiers of Canada
Sportspeople from Whitehorse